, nicknamed  was a Japanese samurai, a hatamoto guard of Edo Castle, who gained his fame by killing the unpopular wakadoshiyori  in March 1784 in the castle.

History
On March 24th, 1784, in Edo castle, Sano shouted three times "remember",  to Tanuma Okitomo and cut him with a wakizashi. Tanuma died of his wounds eight days later, and Sano was condemned to commit seppuku. The Sano clan was punished, but as Sano was the only male heir to the clan, the estate of the family went back to the father.
The exact motive of Sano remains unclear and there are several competing theories, but the shogunate put his actions on a moment of madness. Sano's tomb is in Tokuhonji, near Asakusa.

Post-death celebration
Tanuma and his father, Tanuma Okitsugu, were unpopular; furthermore, the country had just been through a famine caused by the Mount Asama eruption, and coincidently just after the killing, the price of rice started to fall. Tokuhonji became a site for his celebration.

The campus of Otsuka Women's University in Sanbanchō is on the site of his residence, which is marked by a touristic sign.

Reference

1757 births
1784 deaths
Samurai
Executed Japanese people